Fang Zhongru (1901 – June 5, 1983) was a People's Republic of China politician. He was born in Xianyang, Shaanxi. He was educated at Peking University and in the Soviet Union. He was CPPCC Chairman, deputy party chief and delegate to the National People's Congress of his home province. He was Chinese Communist Party Committee Secretary and deputy mayor of Xi'an. He attended the 1st National People's Congress, 2nd National People's Congress and 3rd National People's Congress. He was a member of the Standing Committee of the Chinese People's Political Consultative Conference. He died in Beijing.

References

1901 births
1983 deaths
Members of the Standing Committee of the 5th Chinese People's Political Consultative Conference
Delegates to the 1st National People's Congress
Delegates to the 2nd National People's Congress
Delegates to the 3rd National People's Congress
People from Xianyang
Communist University of the Toilers of the East alumni
National University of Peking alumni
Deputy Communist Party secretaries of Shaanxi
Communist Party secretaries of Xi'an
CPPCC Chairmen of Shaanxi
Delegates to the National People's Congress from Xi'an
Delegates to the National People's Congress from Shaanxi